Malcolm Brodie is the mayor of Richmond, the fourth-largest city in British Columbia.

A lawyer by profession, Brodie was elected to City Council in 1996 and again in 1999, as part of the centre-right Richmond Non-Partisan Association (RNPA). After the resignation of mayor Greg Halsey-Brandt, Brodie was elected mayor in a special by-election on 29 October 2001. He left his RNPA party, and now serves as an independent. Brodie was re-elected by large margins in 2002, 2005, 2008, 2014 and 2018  and 2022. He is the longest-serving mayor in Richmond's history, surpassing Rudy Grauer, who served from 1930 to 1949.

Experience 
Brodie has played various roles in multiple organizations and committees, including Metro Vancouver Director since 2001, Chair of the Zero Waste Committee and Richmond's General Purposes Committee, and vice-chair and trustee of the Municipal Finance Authority. He is also director of PRIMECorp, which manages police records in BC, and a member of the Utilities Committee, Transportation Committee, Finance Committee, Mayor's Committee, Intergovernmental Administration Committee, and RCMP Local Government Contract Management Committee. He served as Director Representative in the Greater Vancouver Transportation Authority (TransLink) board from 2002 to 2007 and as chair in 2006.

A Richmond Resident since 1977, Brodie has two adult children, Garrett and Stephanie, and three grandchildren, Kayla, Matthew, and Brodie.

Recognition 
Brodie received the Queen Elizabeth II Golden Jubilee Medal in 2002, Queen Elizabeth II Diamond Jubilee Medal in 2012, and the Commemorative Medal at the 125th anniversary of the Confederation of Canada in 1992.

Electoral history

2022 Municipal mayoral election: Richmond City Council

2018 Municipal mayoral election: Richmond City Council

2014 Municipal mayoral election: Richmond City Council

References 

Richmond, British Columbia city councillors
Living people
Year of birth missing (living people)
Mayors of places in British Columbia
American emigrants to Canada